Howard Kaylan (born Howard Lawrence Kaplan, June 22, 1947) is an American musician and songwriter, best known as a founding member and lead singer of the 1960s rock band The Turtles, and, along with bandmate and friend Mark Volman, a member of the 1970s rock duo Flo & Eddie, where he used the pseudonym Eddie. Moreover, he also was a member of Frank Zappa's band, The Mothers of Invention.

Early years
Kaylan was born in the Bronx to a Jewish family and grew up in Utica, New York, and Westchester, a neighborhood of Los Angeles, California. He studied choral music and clarinet, and won a Bank of America Fine Arts Award at age 16. He graduated early (as valedictorian) from Westchester High School, and briefly attended University of California, Los Angeles on a scholarship.

Music career

The Turtles
Kaylan and Mark Volman founded The Turtles, a popular band of the late 1960s. At the end of 1970, Kaylan and Volman signed on as members of Frank Zappa's band, The Mothers of Invention. The pair recorded tracks on five albums, toured to support them, and appeared in the film 200 Motels, a semi-documentary film directed by Zappa. They were compelled to use the names Flo & Eddie ("Flo" being shortened from "Phlorescent Leech") and were not allowed legal use of their own names, or that of The Turtles, until multiple lawsuits from that band were settled in 1985.

In 1985 the name "The Turtles" reverted to Kaylan and Volman after fifteen years in litigation, as well as all of the master recordings they made. Thanks to Burger King, the NFL, Sony PlayStation, and countless other television advertisements and motion pictures, the Turtles' catalog remains a staple for licensing and reproduction in the twenty-first century.

Frank Zappa
Howard Kaylan and Mark Volman joined The Mothers of Invention, Frank Zappa's band, after the Turtles broke up, but were contractually prevented from using their real names, and were thus given the names "The Phlorescent Leech" (Mark Volman) and "Eddie" (Howard Kaylan). 

Phlorescent Leech and Eddie appeared on Frank Zappa's 1970 album Chunga's Revenge and in 1971 as lead vocalists on Zappa's Fillmore East album as Howard Kaylan/Mark Volman where they sang "Happy Together", then on Just Another Band From L.A., 200 Motels and much later Playground Psychotics and other Zappa compilations of old live concerts from 1970–71.

Kaylan and Volman left The Mothers of Invention after an irate fan pushed Zappa into the orchestra pit at the Rainbow Theatre in London during a concert on December 10th, 1971, seriously injuring him. With Zappa using a wheelchair and unable to sing or play guitar for a year, The Mothers of Invention were on hiatus so Kaylan and Volman set out on their own as Flo & Eddie, never officially returning to the Mothers.

Flo & Eddie
Kaylan and Volman signed with Columbia as Flo & Eddie. In his autobiography Shell Shocked, Kaylan revealed that upon receiving the cover art for their first album, they were appalled to learn that the printer had mistakenly printed the duo's stage names in the wrong order above their photograph. Volman was identified as Flo, which had been Kaylan's stage name in Zappa's band, and Kaylan was identified as Eddie, Volman's stage name. The label refused to reprint the cover, saying that it would cost too much money. Thus, Kaylan and Volman decided to professionally swap stage names. 

Flo & Eddie released nine albums on Warner Bros. Records and Columbia Records in music; in film they provided music and voices for animated films like Down and Dirty Duck; and they appeared in radio broadcasting.

In the 1980s, "Rock Steady With Flo and Eddie" was recorded in Kingston, Jamaica, and the partners began writing comedy and script with Chris Bearde, Larry Gelbart, and Carl Gottlieb. Simultaneously, they began writing regularly featured columns for Creem, Phonograph Record Magazine and the Los Angeles Free Press.

They also produced many albums for other bands and artists, as well as singing backing vocals on over 100 albums. Flo & Eddie can be heard singing with John Lennon, Bruce Springsteen, Ramones, Blondie, Duran Duran, The Psychedelic Furs, T.Rex, Alice Cooper and many more.

Solo work
In the mid-1990s, Kaylan turned his attention to the collecting and writing of dark fantasy literature and science fiction. He wrote two short stories, by way of experimentation, and both were published in the best-selling anthologies, "Phantoms of the Night" and "Forbidden Acts".

In 2006, Kaylan released a solo album, Dust Bunnies, described as songs "hand-picked by Kaylan from years of seldom-heard B-sides and album cuts recorded by many of his favorite artists and supplemented by new arrangements of more familiar pieces and a rock original or two." It includes covers of The Honeycombs' "Have I the Right?", Barry Ryan's "Eloise", and The Left Banke's "Love Songs in the Night" and "Two by Two".

As of 2008 Kaylan penned the widely read "Eddie's Media Corner" on the official website.

Health and Retirement
In 2018, since Kaylan required heart and back surgery, he was prohibited by his doctors from joining the tour, so Ron Dante (of the Archies, the Cuff Links and the Detergents fame) stood in for him through the summer of 2021.

Kaylan permanently retired from touring in 2017.

Media appearances
He portrayed an orthodox minister who "married" Laura to Stavros in a dream sequence on General Hospital, an old hippie on Suddenly Susan, and a younger one on the It's Garry Shandling's Show.

In 1983, Kaylan appeared in the comedy Get Crazy, starring Malcolm McDowell and Daniel Stern. Kaylan played the part of Captain Cloud, a spiritual guru type of character, leader of a caravan of time-lost, gypsy-like hippies. In 1987, Kaylan and Volman appeared in a new music video of the song "Happy Together", made to promote the romantic comedy Making Mr. Right, which featured the song during its end credits.

In 2001, Kaylan wrote a treatment for a very short film about his first night on tour in London. After taking it to his friend (and Rhino Records president) Harold Bronson for input, the project was lengthened and shot as a one-hour movie. The following year, scenes were added, and it was back into the movie studio again to complete a full-length feature. My Dinner with Jimi thus became the first film written by Kaylan. It was produced by Bronson for Rhino Entertainment and directed by Bill Fishman (Tapeheads, Car 54, Where Are You?) for Fallout Films. In 2005, Kaylan appeared in a featured role in Stephen King's Riding the Bullet.

Kaylan's autobiography Shell Shocked: My Life with the Turtles, Flo and Eddie, and Frank Zappa, Etc. was published by Backbeat Books in March 2013. The book was written with Jeff Tamarkin, and included a foreword by Penn Jillette and cover art by Cal Schenkel.

References

External links
 Howard Kaylan official website
 The Turtles official website
 Turtles / Flo & Eddie discography
 Rock and Roll is Here to Stay…Oy Vey!

1947 births
Living people
American atheists
American rock musicians
The Mothers of Invention members
American male writers
American male screenwriters
Record producers from New York (state)
Songwriters from New York (state)
American male singers
American male actors
American session musicians
The Turtles members
Jewish American musicians
Westchester High School (Los Angeles) alumni